World Outside My Window is the debut album of Canadian R&B singer Glenn Lewis. Released on March 19, 2002, it featured two singles, "Don't You Forget It" and "It's Not Fair". It also features production by Dre & Vidal. The album debuted at number 4 on the Billboard 200 with 85,000 copies sold in the first week. It has sold 377,000 copies to date.

Track listing

Personnel
Adapted from the World Outside My Window liner notes.

Chris Garringer – Mastering (Sterling Sound)
Mark Byers and Sherman Byers – Executive producers and A&R direction (Rockstar Entertainment)
Andre Harris and Vidal Davis – Associate executive producers
David McPherson – A&R direction
Amberdawn Mickle – Product manager (Epic)
Verna M. Miles – A&R manager (Epic)
Julian Alexander – Art direction
Danny Clinch – Photography
Kithe Brewster – Styling

Charts

Weekly charts

Year-end charts

References

2002 debut albums
Glenn Lewis albums
Epic Records albums
Albums produced by Dre & Vidal